Acrocercops eurhythmopa is a moth of the family Gracillariidae, known from Java, Indonesia, as well as Sierra Leone. It was described by Edward Meyrick in 1934. The hostplant for the species is Cola nitida and Sterculia species.

References

eurhythmopa
Moths of Africa
Moths of Asia
Moths described in 1934